Iowa was admitted to the Union on December 28, 1846, and elects United States senators to Class 2 and Class 3. The state's current U.S. senators are Republicans Chuck Grassley (serving since 1981) and Joni Ernst (serving since 2015). Chuck Grassley is Iowa's longest-serving senator (since 1981).

List of senators

|- style="height:2em"
| rowspan=2 colspan=3 | Vacant
| rowspan=2 nowrap | Dec 28, 1846 –Dec 7, 1848
| rowspan=2 | Legislature failed to elect.
| rowspan=2 | —
| 
| rowspan=2 | —
| rowspan=2 | Legislature failed to elect.
| rowspan=2 nowrap | Dec 28, 1846 –Dec 7, 1848
| rowspan=2 colspan=3 | Vacant

|- style="height:2em"
| rowspan=2 

|- style="height:2em"
! rowspan=9 | 1
| rowspan=9 align=left | George W. Jones
| rowspan=9  | Democratic
| rowspan=9 nowrap | Dec 7, 1848 –Mar 3, 1859
| rowspan=3 | Elected in 1848.
| rowspan=3 | 1
| 1
| Elected in 1848.
| rowspan=4 nowrap | Dec 7, 1848 –Feb 22, 1855
| rowspan=4  | Democratic
| rowspan=4 align=right | Augustus C. Dodge
! rowspan=4 | 1

|- style="height:2em"
| 
| rowspan=4 | 2
| rowspan=3 | Re-elected in 1849.Resigned to become U.S. Minister to Spain, having lost re-election.

|- style="height:2em"
| 

|- style="height:2em"
| rowspan=6 | Re-elected in 1852.Lost renomination.
| rowspan=6 | 2
| rowspan=2 

|- style="height:2em"
|  
| nowrap | Feb 22, 1855 –Mar 3, 1855
| colspan=3 | Vacant

|- style="height:2em"
| rowspan=3 
| rowspan=5 | 3
| Elected in 1855.Elected invalidated, as the Iowa Senate had not participated in it.
| nowrap | Mar 4, 1855 –Jan 5, 1857
|  | Free Soil
| align=right | James Harlan
! rowspan=8 | 2

|- style="height:2em"
|  
| nowrap | Jan 5, 1857 –Jan 29, 1857
| colspan=2 | Vacant

|- style="height:2em"
| rowspan=3 | Re-elected to finish his vacant term.
| rowspan=6 nowrap | Jan 29, 1857 –May 15, 1865
| rowspan=6  | Republican
| rowspan=6 align=right | James Harlan|- style="height:2em"
| 

|- style="height:2em"
! rowspan=8 | 2
| rowspan=8 align=left | James W. Grimes
| rowspan=8  | Republican
| rowspan=8 nowrap | Mar 4, 1859 –Dec 6, 1869
| rowspan=3 | Elected in 1858.
| rowspan=3 | 3
| 

|- style="height:2em"
| 
| rowspan=5 | 4
| rowspan=3 |Re-elected in 1860.Resigned to become U.S. Secretary of the Interior.

|- style="height:2em"
| 

|- style="height:2em"
| rowspan=5 | Re-elected in 1864.Resigned due to ill health.
| rowspan=7 | 4
| rowspan=3 

|- style="height:2em"
|  
| nowrap | May 15, 1865 –Jan 13, 1866
| colspan=3 | Vacant

|- style="height:2em"
| Elected to finish Harlan's term.Lost nomination for the next term.
| nowrap | Jan 13, 1866 –Mar 3, 1867
|  | Republican
| align=right | Samuel J. Kirkwood
! 3

|- style="height:2em"
| 
| rowspan=5 | 5
| rowspan=5 | Elected in 1866.Lost re-election.
| rowspan=5 nowrap | Mar 4, 1867 –Mar 3, 1873
| rowspan=5  | Republican
| rowspan=5 align=right | James Harlan
! rowspan=5 | 4

|- style="height:2em"
| rowspan=3 

|- style="height:2em"
| colspan=3 | Vacant
| nowrap | Dec 6, 1869 –Jan 18, 1870
|  

|- style="height:2em"
! 3
| align=left | James B. Howell
|  | Republican
| nowrap | Jan 18, 1870 –Mar 3, 1871
| Elected to finish Grimes's term.Retired.

|- style="height:2em"
! rowspan=3 | 4
| rowspan=3 align=left | George G. Wright
| rowspan=3  | Republican
| rowspan=3 nowrap | Mar 4, 1871 –Mar 3, 1877
| rowspan=3 | Elected in 1870.Retired.
| rowspan=3 | 5
| 

|- style="height:2em"
| 
| rowspan=3 | 6
| rowspan=3 | Elected in 1872.
| rowspan=21 nowrap | Mar 4, 1873 –Aug 4, 1908
| rowspan=21  | Republican
| rowspan=21 align=right | William B. Allison
! rowspan=21 | 5

|- style="height:2em"
| 

|- style="height:2em"
! rowspan=3 | 5
| rowspan=3 align=left | Samuel J. Kirkwood
| rowspan=3  | Republican
| rowspan=3 nowrap | Mar 4, 1877 –Mar 7, 1881
| rowspan=3 | Elected in 1876 or 1877.Resigned to become U.S. Secretary of the Interior.
| rowspan=4 | 6
| 

|- style="height:2em"
| 
| rowspan=4 | 7
| rowspan=4 | Re-elected in 1878.

|- style="height:2em"
| rowspan=2 

|- style="height:2em"
! 6
| align=left | James W. McDill
|  | Republican
| nowrap | Mar 8, 1881 –Mar 3, 1883
| Appointed to continue Kirkwood's term.Elected in 1882 to finish Kirkwood's term.Retired.

|- style="height:2em"
! rowspan=6 | 7
| rowspan=6 align=left | James F. Wilson
| rowspan=6  | Republican
| rowspan=6 nowrap | Mar 4, 1883 –Mar 3, 1895
| rowspan=3 | Elected in 1882.
| rowspan=3 | 7
| 

|- style="height:2em"
| 
| rowspan=3 | 8
| rowspan=3 | Re-elected in 1884.

|- style="height:2em"
| 

|- style="height:2em"
| rowspan=3 | Re-elected in 1888.Retired.
| rowspan=3 | 8
| 

|- style="height:2em"
| 
| rowspan=3 | 9
| rowspan=3 | Re-elected in 1890.

|- style="height:2em"
| 

|- style="height:2em"
! rowspan=3 | 8
| rowspan=3 align=left | John H. Gear
| rowspan=3  | Republican
| rowspan=3 nowrap | Mar 4, 1895 –Jul 14, 1900
| rowspan=3 | Elected in 1894.Re-elected in 1900, but died.
| rowspan=5 | 9
| 

|- style="height:2em"
| 
| rowspan=5 | 10
| rowspan=5 | Re-elected in 1896.

|- style="height:2em"
| rowspan=3 

|- style="height:2em"
| colspan=3 | Vacant
| nowrap | Jul 14, 1900 –Aug 22, 1900
|  

|- style="height:2em"
! rowspan=8 | 9
| rowspan=8 align=left | Jonathan P. Dolliver
| rowspan=8  | Republican
| rowspan=8 nowrap | Aug 22, 1900 –Oct 15, 1910
| Appointed to finish Gear's term.

|- style="height:2em"
| rowspan=3 | Appointed to begin the vacant term.Elected in 1902 to finish the vacant term.
| rowspan=3 | 10
| 

|- style="height:2em"
| 
| rowspan=5 | 11
| rowspan=3 | Re-elected in 1902.Renominated in 1908 but died before the general election.

|- style="height:2em"
| 

|- style="height:2em"
| rowspan=4 | Re-elected in 1907.Died.
| rowspan=8 | 11
| rowspan=3 

|- style="height:2em"
|  
| nowrap | Aug 4, 1908 –Nov 24, 1908
| colspan=3 | Vacant

|- style="height:2em"
| Elected to finish Allison's term.
| rowspan=16 nowrap | Nov 24, 1908 –Jul 30, 1926
| rowspan=16  | Republican
| rowspan=16 align=right | Albert B. Cummins
! rowspan=16 | 6

|- style="height:2em"
| rowspan=3 
| rowspan=6 | 12
| rowspan=6 | Re-elected in 1909.

|- style="height:2em"
| colspan=3 | Vacant
| nowrap | Oct 15, 1910 –Nov 12, 1910
|  

|- style="height:2em"
! rowspan=2 | 10
| rowspan=2 align=left | Lafayette Young
| rowspan=2  | Republican
| rowspan=2 nowrap | Nov 12, 1910 –Apr 11, 1911
| rowspan=2 | Appointed to continue Dolliver's term.Lost election to finish Dolliver's term.

|- style="height:2em"
| rowspan=2 

|- style="height:2em"
! rowspan=6 | 11
| rowspan=6 align=left | William S. Kenyon
| rowspan=6  | Republican
| rowspan=6 nowrap | Apr 12, 1911 –Feb 24, 1922
| rowspan=1 | Elected to finish Dolliver's term.

|- style="height:2em"
| rowspan=3 | Re-elected in 1913.
| rowspan=3 | 12
| 

|- style="height:2em"
| 
| rowspan=3 | 13
| rowspan=3 | Re-elected in 1914.

|- style="height:2em"
| 

|- style="height:2em"
| rowspan=2 | Re-elected in 1918.Resigned to become Judge of the U.S. Court of Appeals.
| rowspan=5 | 13
| 

|- style="height:2em"
| rowspan=3 
| rowspan=8 | 14
| rowspan=6 | Re-elected in 1920.Lost renomination, then died.

|- style="height:2em"
! 12
| align=left | Charles A. Rawson
|  | Republican
| nowrap | Feb 24, 1922 –Dec 1, 1922
| Appointed to continue Kenyon's term.Retired when his successor was elected.

|- style="height:2em"
! rowspan=3 | 13
| rowspan=3 align=left | Smith W. Brookhart
| rowspan=3  | Republican
| rowspan=3 nowrap | Dec 1, 1922 –Apr 12, 1926
| rowspan=2 | Elected to finish Kenyon's term.

|- style="height:2em"
| 

|- style="height:2em"
| Re-elected in 1924.Lost election challenge.
| rowspan=6 | 14
| rowspan=4 

|- style="height:2em"
! rowspan=5 | 14
| rowspan=5 align=left | Daniel F. Steck
| rowspan=5  | Democratic
| rowspan=5 nowrap | Apr 12, 1926 –Mar 3, 1931
| rowspan=5 | Successfully challenged his predecessor's election.Lost re-election.

|- style="height:2em"
|  
| nowrap | Jul 30, 1926 –Aug 7, 1926
| colspan=3 | Vacant

|- style="height:2em"
| Appointed to continue Cummins's term.Elected in 1926 to finish Cummins's term.Retired.
| nowrap | Aug 7, 1926 –Mar 3, 1927
|  | Republican
| align=right | David W. Stewart
! 7

|- style="height:2em"
| 
| rowspan=3 | 15
| rowspan=3 | Elected in 1926.Lost renomination and then lost re-election as an Independent.
| rowspan=3 nowrap | Mar 4, 1927 –Mar 3, 1933
| rowspan=3  | Republican
| rowspan=3 align=right | Smith W. Brookhart
! rowspan=3 | 8

|- style="height:2em"
| 

|- style="height:2em"
! rowspan=5 | 15
| rowspan=5 align=left | Lester J. Dickinson
| rowspan=5  | Republican
| rowspan=5 nowrap | Mar 4, 1931 –Jan 3, 1937
| rowspan=5 | Elected in 1930.Lost re-election.
| rowspan=5 | 15
| 

|- style="height:2em"
| 
| rowspan=5 | 16
| rowspan=2 | Elected in 1932.Died.
| rowspan=2 nowrap | Mar 4, 1933 –Jul 16, 1936
| rowspan=2  | Democratic
| rowspan=2 align=right | Richard L. Murphy
! rowspan=2 | 9

|- style="height:2em"
| rowspan=3 

|- style="height:2em"
|  
| nowrap | Jul 16, 1936 –Nov 3, 1936
| colspan=3 | Vacant

|- style="height:2em"
| rowspan=2 | Elected to finish Murphy's term.
| rowspan=5 nowrap | Nov 3, 1936 –Jan 3, 1945
| rowspan=5  | Democratic
| rowspan=5 align=right | Guy Gillette
! rowspan=5 | 10

|- style="height:2em"
! rowspan=3 | 16
| rowspan=3 align=left | Clyde L. Herring
| rowspan=3  | Democratic
| rowspan=3 nowrap | Jan 3, 1937 –Jan 3, 1943
| rowspan=3 | Elected in 1936.Didn't take seat until Jan 15, 1937 in order to remain Governor of Iowa.Lost re-election.
| rowspan=3 | 16
| 

|- style="height:2em"
| 
| rowspan=3 | 17
| rowspan=3 | Re-elected in 1938.Lost re-election.

|- style="height:2em"
| 

|- style="height:2em"

|- style="height:2em"
! rowspan=3 | 17
| rowspan=3 align=left | George A. Wilson
| rowspan=3  | Republican
| rowspan=3 nowrap | Jan 3, 1943 –Jan 3, 1949
| rowspan=3 | Elected in 1942.Didn't take seat until Jan 14, 1943 in order to remain Governor of Iowa.Lost re-election.
| rowspan=3 | 17
| 

|- style="height:2em"
| 
| rowspan=3 | 18
| rowspan=3 | Elected in 1944.
| rowspan=12 nowrap | Jan 3, 1945 –Jan 3, 1969
| rowspan=12  | Republican
| rowspan=12 align=right | Bourke B. Hickenlooper
! rowspan=12 | 11

|- style="height:2em"
| 

|- style="height:2em"
! rowspan=3 | 18
| rowspan=3 align=left | Guy Gillette
| rowspan=3  | Democratic
| rowspan=3 nowrap | Jan 3, 1949 –Jan 3, 1955
| rowspan=3 | Elected in 1948.Lost re-election.
| rowspan=3 | 18
| 

|- style="height:2em"
| 
| rowspan=3 | 19
| rowspan=3 | Re-elected in 1950.

|- style="height:2em"
| 

|- style="height:2em"
! rowspan=3 | 19
| rowspan=3 align=left | Thomas E. Martin
| rowspan=3  | Republican
| rowspan=3 nowrap | Jan 3, 1955 –Jan 3, 1961
| rowspan=3 | Elected in 1954.Retired.
| rowspan=3 | 19
| 

|- style="height:2em"
| 
| rowspan=3 | 20
| rowspan=3 | Re-elected in 1956.

|- style="height:2em"
| 

|- style="height:2em"
! rowspan=6 | 20
| rowspan=6 align=left | Jack Miller
| rowspan=6  | Republican
| rowspan=6 nowrap | Jan 3, 1961 –Jan 3, 1973
| rowspan=3 | Elected in 1960.
| rowspan=3 | 20
| 

|- style="height:2em"
| 
| rowspan=3 | 21
| rowspan=3 | Re-elected in 1962Retired.

|- style="height:2em"
| 

|- style="height:2em"
| rowspan=3 | Re-elected in 1966.Lost re-election.
| rowspan=3 | 21
| 

|- style="height:2em"
| 
| rowspan=3 | 22
| rowspan=3 | Elected in 1968.Retired.
| rowspan=3 nowrap | Jan 3, 1969 –Jan 3, 1975
| rowspan=3  | Democratic
| rowspan=3 align=right | Harold Hughes
! rowspan=3 | 12

|- style="height:2em"
| 

|- style="height:2em"
! rowspan=3 | 21
| rowspan=3 align=left | Dick Clark
| rowspan=3  | Democratic
| rowspan=3 nowrap | Jan 3, 1973 –Jan 3, 1979
| rowspan=3 | Elected in 1972.Lost re-election.
| rowspan=3 | 22
| 

|- style="height:2em"
| 
| rowspan=3 | 23
| rowspan=3 | Elected in 1974.Lost re-election.
| rowspan=3 nowrap | Jan 3, 1975 –Jan 3, 1981
| rowspan=3  | Democratic
| rowspan=3 align=right | John Culver
! rowspan=3 | 13

|- style="height:2em"
| 

|- style="height:2em"
! rowspan=3 | 22
| rowspan=3 align=left | Roger Jepsen
| rowspan=3  | Republican
| rowspan=3 nowrap | Jan 3, 1979 –Jan 3, 1985
| rowspan=3 | Elected in 1978.Lost re-election.
| rowspan=3 | 23
| 

|- style="height:2em"
| 
| rowspan=3 | 24
| rowspan=3 | Elected in 1980.
| rowspan=24 nowrap | Jan 3, 1981 –Present
| rowspan=24  | Republican
| rowspan=24 align=right | Chuck Grassley
! rowspan=24 | 14

|- style="height:2em"
| 

|- style="height:2em"
! rowspan=15 | 23
| rowspan=15 align=left | Tom Harkin
| rowspan=15  | Democratic
| rowspan=15 nowrap | Jan 3, 1985 –Jan 3, 2015
| rowspan=3 | Elected in 1984.
| rowspan=3 | 24
| 

|- style="height:2em"
| 
| rowspan=3 | 25
| rowspan=3 | Re-elected in 1986.

|- style="height:2em"
| 

|- style="height:2em"
| rowspan=3 | Re-elected in 1990.
| rowspan=3 | 25
| 

|- style="height:2em"
| 
| rowspan=3 | 26
| rowspan=3 | Re-elected in 1992.

|- style="height:2em"
| 

|- style="height:2em"
| rowspan=3 | Re-elected in 1996.
| rowspan=3 | 26
| 

|- style="height:2em"
| 
| rowspan=3 | 27
| rowspan=3 | Re-elected in 1998.

|- style="height:2em"
| 

|- style="height:2em"
| rowspan=3 | Re-elected in 2002.
| rowspan=3 | 27
| 

|- style="height:2em"
| 
| rowspan=3 | 28
| rowspan=3 | Re-elected in 2004.

|- style="height:2em"
| 

|- style="height:2em"
| rowspan=3 | Re-elected in 2008Retired.
| rowspan=3 | 28
| 

|- style="height:2em"
| 
| rowspan=3 | 29
| rowspan=3 | Re-elected in 2010.

|- style="height:2em"
| 

|- style="height:2em"
! rowspan=6 | 24
| rowspan=6 align=left | Joni Ernst
| rowspan=6  | Republican
| rowspan=6 nowrap | Jan 3, 2015 –Present
| rowspan=3 | Elected in 2014.
| rowspan=3 | 29
| 

|- style="height:2em"
| 
| rowspan=3 | 30
| rowspan=3 | Re-elected in 2016.

|- style="height:2em"
| 

|- style="height:2em"
| rowspan=3  |Re-elected in 2020.
| rowspan=3 | 30
| 

|- style="height:2em"
| 
| rowspan=3|31
| rowspan=3| Re-elected in 2022.

|- style="height:2em"
| 

|- style="height:2em"
| rowspan=2 colspan=5 | To be determined in the 2026 election.
| rowspan=2 | 31
| 

|- style="height:2em"
| 
| 32
| colspan=5 | To be determined in the 2028 election.

See also

 List of United States representatives from Iowa
 United States congressional delegations from Iowa
Elections in Iowa

Notes

References 
 
 

 
United States senators
Iowa